Leonard Frank Werry (May 30, 1927 – February 25, 1973) was a provincial level politician from Alberta, Canada. He served as a Member of the Legislative Assembly of Alberta from 1967 until his death in 1973 and was a Cabinet Minister in the Government of Alberta of Premier Peter Lougheed from 1971 to 1973.

Political career
Werry ran as a Progressive Conservative candidate in the Northwest Calgary riding of Calgary Bowness in the 1967 Alberta general election. He defeated former Member of Parliament Charles Johnston in a hotly contested election to pick up that seat for the opposition Progressive Conservatives.

Werry ran for a second term in office in Calgary-Foothills in the 1971 Alberta general election as Calgary Bowness was abolished through redistricting. He picked up the new riding with a more comfortable result.

The Progressive Conservative party formed government in 1971. Premier Peter Lougheed appointed Werry as Minister of Telephones and Utilities. He died in a car accident in 1973.

References

External links
Legislative Assembly of Alberta Members Listing

Progressive Conservative Association of Alberta MLAs
1973 deaths
1927 births
Members of the Executive Council of Alberta
Road incident deaths in Canada
Accidental deaths in Alberta